Elkhart Community Schools is a school district headquartered in Elkhart, Indiana.

The district serves most of Elkhart as well as Bristol and Simonton Lake.

 it had about 13,000 students.

Schools
High schools (Grades: 9 - 12):
 Elkhart High School - West Campus (Formerly Elkhart Memorial High School)

 Elkhart High School - East Campus (Formerly Elkhart Central High School)

Middle schools (Grades: 7 - 8):
 Pierre Moran Middle School
 North Side Middle School
 West Side Middle School

Elementary schools (Grades: K - 6):
 Beardsley
 Mary Beck
 Bristol
 Cleveland
 Mary Daly
 Eastwood
 Mary Feeser
 Hawthorne 
 Monger
 Osolo
 Pinewood
 Riverview
 Roosevelt
 Woodland

Food Program
The Elkhart Schools have partnered with South Bend-based food rescue non-profit Cultivate, to reuse food slated to be discarded by the schools and repurposing them into meals for students in need.

References

External links
 

School districts in Indiana
Elkhart, Indiana
Education in Elkhart County, Indiana